Sigh of His Highness is a Chinese historical television series based on the life of Prince Gong, an influential Manchu prince and statesman of the late Qing dynasty. The series was directed by Li Wenlong and starred Chen Baoguo as Prince Gong. It was first broadcast on Sichuan TV in China in 2006.

Plot
The series is set in 19th-century China under the Manchu-led Qing dynasty. Prince Gong is a younger half-brother of the Xianfeng Emperor, but their relationship is somewhat strained because they previously competed for the succession to their father's throne. In 1860, during the Second Opium War, when the Anglo-French forces close in on Beijing, the Xianfeng Emperor flees to the Chengde Summer Palace in Hebei and orders Prince Gong to stay behind in the capital, Beijing, to make peace with the enemy. After enduring humiliation and manoeuvring his way through complex negotiations, Prince Gong signs the Convention of Beijing on behalf of the Qing Empire with the British, French and Russians. With this achievement, he not only improves his political standing in the imperial court, but also earns the respect of the foreigners.

The following year, the Xianfeng Emperor dies in Chengde. His young son, Zaichun, succeeds him as the Tongzhi Emperor. Before his death, the Xianfeng Emperor had appointed the senior minister Sushun and seven others to serve as regents for his son until he is old enough to rule on his own. In November 1861, with support from the Empress Dowagers Cixi and Ci'an, Prince Gong launches the Xinyou Coup and succeeds in seizing power from Sushun and the regents. In the next four years, Prince Gong reaches the pinnacle of his political career as he is appointed Prince-Regent and placed in charge of important state and military affairs, including control over the Grand Council. He also has the opportunity to take the throne but refrains from doing so. He spearheads the Self-Strengthening Movement and introduces new policies in his attempts to modernise China and maintain friendly relations with other countries.

Over the years, however, Prince Gong's relationship with Empress Dowager Cixi deteriorates as she becomes more power-hungry and he starts distancing himself from her. At the same time, the Empress Dowager's position in the imperial court gradually becomes more prominent, especially after the death of her son, the Tongzhi Emperor. The Tongzhi Emperor's cousin Zaitian, who succeeds him as the Guangxu Emperor, becomes a puppet ruler under Empress Dowager Cixi's control. Over time, Empress Dowager Cixi consolidates power in her hands and becomes the sole de facto ruler when her co-regent, Empress Dowager Ci'an, dies under mysterious circumstances. Prince Gong's standing in the imperial court declines as Empress Dowager Cixi increasingly distrusts him and gradually reduces his power by removing him from key appointments.

In 1885, Prince Gong falls from grace after shouldering the blame for the Grand Council's indecisiveness on whether to fight or make peace during the Sino-French War. As a consequence, Empress Dowager Cixi relieves him from his appointments and forces him to retire. In 1894, following the outbreak of the First Sino-Japanese War, Prince Gong returns to the imperial court to handle the crisis. However, despite his efforts, he fails to prevent another Qing defeat at the hands of the Japanese. He eventually dies of illness four years later.

Cast

 Chen Baoguo as Prince Gong
 Yuan Li as Empress Dowager Cixi
 Wang Gang as Sengge Rinchen
 Wang Yan as Jiajia
 Song Jia as Empress Dowager Ci'an
 Qin Yan as Sushun
 Du Zhiguo as the Daoguang Emperor
 Wang Huichun as Zuo Zongtang
 Dai Chunrong as Empress Xiaoquancheng
 Luo Xiangjin as Suyi
 Wang Hui as the Xianfeng Emperor
 Xu Qiwen as Ming'er (Prince Gong's concubine)
 Lu Yong as Baojun
 Liu Wei as Wenxiang
 Feng Shaofeng as Ronglu
 Xi Huiling as Rong'er (Yehenara Wanzhen)
 Bai Qinglin as Consort Li
 Pan Hongliang as An Dehai
 Wang Gang as Prince Chun
 Zeng Ang as Li Lianying
 Shen Tonghua as Li Hongzhang
 Gu Yang as the Tongzhi Emperor
 Wan Changhao as the Tongzhi Emperor (young)
 Wang Zhongwei as He Fan
 Xu Guang as Zaicheng
 Dai Yun as Zaicheng (young)
 Xia Zhixiang as Cao Yuying
 Kelin as Hede
 Wang Jianguo as Guiliang
 Guo Dong as Zeng Guofan
 Zhang Bingqi as Zhu Xueqin
 Hong Yin as Li Hongzao
 Yue Ding as Zaiyuan
 Yao Jianming as Duanhua
 Ni Jiali as Yuzi
 Tu Liman as Bailing (Gulun Princess Rongshou)
 Zhu Li as Bailing (young)
 Ren Xihong as Zeng Guoquan
 Huang Wei as Woren
 Dong Zhongcheng as Xu Tong
 Zhang Wenyi as Weng Tonghe
 Zhao Le as Prince Dun
 Shi Jipu as Jia Zhen
 Jin Bo as the Guangxu Emperor
 Gao Wei as Shengbao
 Mi Yang as Empress Jiashun
 Li Xiang as Zhiduan
 Zhang Lei as Zhenling
 Cai Xuan as Shuiling
 Anatoly Shanin as Harry Smith Parkes

Broadcasts in other regions
Hong Kong's TVB Jade first aired the series on weekday nights from 26 April 2007. Starting on 12 May, the series was broadcast on weekend afternoons instead. On 24 June, TVB stopped airing the series and the remaining episodes were broadcast from 1 September to 16 October 2008 on weekday nights.

External links
  Sigh of His Highness on xinhuanet.com
  Sigh of His Highness official page on TVB's website

TVB dramas
Television series set in the Qing dynasty
Chinese historical television series